Train Market or Railway Market may refer to:
Talat Rotfai (lit. "train market"), a night market in Bangkok, Thailand
Maeklong Railway Market, a market in Samut Songkhram Province, Thailand